Joseph Jin Dechen (June 19, 1919 – November 21, 2002) was a Chinese Catholic priest and Bishop Emeritus of the Roman Catholic Diocese of Nanyang.

Biography
He was ordained a priest in 1944. In 1958, he was arrested for the first time and sentenced to life in prison. This sentence was settled and he was released in 1973. In December 1981, when he was Bishop Emeritus in Roman Catholic Diocese of Nanyang, he was again arrested, charged with resistance to abortion and birth control, and was sentenced to 15 years of prison and five years of subsequent loss of political rights on July 27, 1982. He was detained in the Third Province Prison in Yu County (now Yuzhou), near Zhengzhou in Henan, and was pardoned and released in May 1992 and ordered to stay in his village Jinjiajiang, near Nanyang. He was out of weakness when he was released from prison.

References

1919 births
2002 deaths
20th-century Roman Catholic bishops in China